Pietro Antonio Giramo (fl.1619 in Naples – c. 1630) was an Italian baroque composer.
His surviving works consist of two works in collections 1619, 1620, the Arie for several voices (Naples, 1630) and a reprint of two cantatas; Il pazzo con la pazza ristampata and  Uno ospedale per gl’infermi d’amore (A Hospital for the Love-Sick) (after 1630).

Recordings
Thomas Hengelbrock

References

Musicians from Naples
17th-century Italian composers
Italian male composers
Year of birth unknown
Year of death unknown
17th-century male musicians